Memories of Murder (also known as Passing through Veils) is a 1990 action–crime television film starring Nancy Allen, directed by Robert Lewis and written by John Harrison.

Memories of Murder is the first of many original films that would be produced for the Lifetime Television Network, and, due to its popularity, would subsequently be released on VHS and DVD on July 31, 1990. Actress  Vanity co-stars. The film was shot in British Columbia.

Plot
Jennifer (Nancy Allen) is a woman who is suffering from amnesia to the extent that she does not even recognize her husband and daughter. Extremely confused and tormented, she desperately seeks to piece together her life and, in doing so, stumbles upon some startling secrets from her shadowy past. She discovers that a female killer connected to her from her earlier life is intent on stalking her and seeking revenge by killing her and her family.

Cast
 Nancy Allen as Jennifer Gordon/Corey
 Nick Benedict as Mr. Bates
 Olivia Brown as Brenda
Linda Darlow
 Don S. Davis
Jerome Eden as Store Manager
Robyn Simons as Amy
 Robin Thomas as Michael
 Vanity as Carmen

Critical reception
Chris Willman of the Los Angeles Times called the film "amazingly pedestrian" in terms of its mystery. Daniel Ruth of the Chicago Sun-Times wrote that he "couldn't keep track" of what was happening in the plot. Ken Tucker of the Entertainment Weekly gave it a "D" grade, saying, "Memories of Murder is full of romance-novel dialogue".

References

External links

1990 films
1990 action thriller films
1990 crime thriller films
American action thriller films
American crime thriller films
Lifetime (TV network) films
Films about amnesia
1990s American films